Kamenka is a rural locality (a selo) in Beloyarovsky Selsoviet of Mazanovsky District, Amur Oblast, Russia. The population was 11 as of 2018. There are 3 streets.

Geography 
Kamenka is located 69 km southeast of Novokiyevsky Uval (the district's administrative centre) by road.

References 

Rural localities in Mazanovsky District